Lisa Keller (born 15 July 1969) is an Australian former professional tennis player.

While competing on the professional tour she reached a career high singles ranking of 468. In doubles she peaked at 280 in the world and won an ITF doubles title at Setúbal, Portugal in 1989.

Keller featured in the women's doubles main draw at the 1991 Australian Open, as a wildcard pairing with Robyn Mawdsley. They were beaten in the first round by Cathy Caverzasio and Sandra Wasserman.

ITF finals

Doubles: 4 (1–3)

References

External links
 
 

1969 births
Living people
Australian female tennis players